The Vario-Sonnar T* DT 16–80 mm f/3.5-4.5 ZA (SAL-1680Z) is a high-quality zoom lens compatible with cameras using the Sony α, and Minolta AF lens mounts. It was designed and is manufactured by Sony in Japan in collaboration with Carl Zeiss.

The lens is designed specifically for use with APS-C sized image sensors, and thus will result in vignetting on 35 mm (full frame) cameras.  When the 1.5× crop factor of current Sony digital single-lens reflex cameras is considered, the lens has an effective equivalent 24–120 mm focal length.

See also
 Zeiss Vario-Sonnar

Sources
Dyxum lens data

16–80
16–80
Camera lenses introduced in 2007